Assyro-Chaldean Babylonian cuneiform numerals were written in cuneiform, using a wedge-tipped reed stylus to make a mark on a soft clay tablet which would be exposed in the sun to harden to create a permanent record.

The Babylonians, who were famous for their astronomical observations, as well as their calculations (aided by their invention of the abacus),  used a sexagesimal (base-60) positional numeral system inherited from either the Sumerian or the Akkadian civilizations. Neither of the predecessors was a positional system (having a convention for which 'end' of the numeral represented the units).

Origin
This system first appeared around 2000 BC; its structure reflects the decimal lexical numerals of Semitic languages rather than Sumerian lexical numbers.  However, the use of a special Sumerian sign for 60 (beside two Semitic signs for the same number) attests to a relation with the Sumerian system.

Characters
The Babylonian system is credited as being the first known positional numeral system, in which the value of a particular digit depends both on the digit itself and its position within the number. This was an extremely important development because non-place-value systems require unique symbols to represent each power of a base (ten, one hundred, one thousand, and so forth), which can make calculations more difficult.

These symbols and their values  were combined to form a digit in a sign-value notation quite similar to that of Roman numerals; for example, the combination  represented the digit for 23 (see table of digits above). A space was left to indicate a place without value, similar to the modern-day zero. Babylonians later devised a sign to represent this empty place. They lacked a symbol to serve the function of radix point, so the place of the units had to be inferred from context :  could have represented 23 or 23×60 or 23×60×60 or 23/60, etc.

Their system clearly used internal decimal to represent digits, but it was not really a mixed-radix system of bases 10 and 6, since the ten sub-base was used merely to facilitate the representation of the large set of digits needed, while the place-values in a digit string were consistently 60-based and the arithmetic needed to work with these digit strings was correspondingly sexagesimal.

The legacy of sexagesimal still survives to this day, in the form of degrees (360° in a circle or 60° in an angle of an equilateral triangle), arcminutes, and arcseconds in trigonometry and the measurement of time, although both of these systems are actually mixed radix.

A common theory is that 60, a superior highly composite number (the previous and next in the series being 12 and 120), was chosen due to its prime factorization: 2×2×3×5, which makes it divisible by 1, 2, 3, 4, 5, 6, 10, 12, 15, 20, 30, and 60. Integers and fractions were represented identically—a radix point was not written but rather made clear by context.

Zero
The Babylonians did not technically have a digit for, nor a concept of, the number zero. Although they understood the idea of nothingness, it was not seen as a number—merely the lack of a number. Later Babylonian texts used a placeholder to represent zero, but only in the medial positions, and not on the right-hand side of the number, as we do in numbers like .

See also 

 
 Babylon
 Babylonia
 Babylonian mathematics
 History of zero
 Numeral system

References

Bibliography

External links 

 Babylonian numerals  
 Cuneiform numbers 
 Babylonian Mathematics
 High resolution photographs, descriptions, and analysis of the root(2) tablet (YBC 7289) from the Yale Babylonian Collection
 Photograph, illustration, and description of the root(2) tablet from the Yale Babylonian Collection 
 Babylonian Numerals by Michael Schreiber, Wolfram Demonstrations Project.
 
 CESCNC – a handy and easy-to use numeral converter

Babylonian mathematics
Non-standard positional numeral systems
Numeral systems
Numerals